Schinia argentifascia is a moth of the family Noctuidae. It is found in North America, including Arizona, California, Baja California, Nevada, New Mexico, Texas and Utah.

The wingspan is about 24 mm.

The larvae feed on Ericameria species.

External links
Images
Butterflies and Moths of North America
Bug Guide

Schinia
Moths of North America
Taxa named by William Barnes (entomologist)
Taxa named by James Halliday McDunnough
Moths described in 1912